is a passenger railway station in the city of Hashimoto, Wakayama Prefecture, Japan, operated by the private railway company Nankai Electric Railway.

Lines
Kimitōge Station is served by the Nankai Kōya Line, and is located 38.6 kilometers from the terminus of the line at Shiomibashi Station and 37.9 kilometers from Namba Station.

Station layout
The station consists of two opposed side platforms connected by an underground passage. The station is unattended.

Platforms

Adjacent stations

History
Kimitōge Station opened on March 11, 1915 on the Takano Mountain Railway. The line was renamed the Osaka Takano Railway on April 30 of the same year, and part of the Nankai Railway network through mergers in 1922. The Nankai Railway was merged into the Kintetsu group in 1944 by orders of the Japanese government, and reemerged as the Nankai Railway Company in 1947.

Passenger statistics
In fiscal 2019, the station was used by an average of 537 passengers daily (boarding passengers only).

Surrounding area
 Kongō-Ikoma-Kisen Quasi-National Park
 Hashimoto City Hashiramoto Elementary School
 Hashimoto City Hashiramoto Kindergarten

See also
List of railway stations in Japan

References

External links

 Kimitōge Station Official Site

Railway stations in Japan opened in 1915
Railway stations in Wakayama Prefecture
Hashimoto, Wakayama